Europe '72: Beat Club, Bremen, West Germany (4/21/1972) is a live album by the Grateful Dead. It was recorded for the Beat-Club TV show instead of at a concert venue. It is notable for being the shortest concert of the tour, because it was a television performance. On the album, the songs "Loser" and "Black-Throated Wind" are not included (they were the soundcheck).

The video shot for the Beat-Club TV episode was shown in movie theaters in the U.S. on July 17, 2014, as that year's Grateful Dead Meet-Up at the Movies.

Track listing
"Bertha" (Garcia, Hunter) – 6:06
"Playing in the Band" (Weir, Hart, Hunter) – 9:58
"Mr. Charlie" (McKernan, Hunter) – 4:05
"Sugaree" (Garcia, Hunter) – 7:53
"One More Saturday Night" (Weir) – 4:51
"Playing in the Band" (Weir, Hart, Hunter) – 10:56
"Beat It On Down the Line" (Fuller) – 3:03
"Truckin'" (Garcia, Lesh, Weir, Hunter) – 9:33
"Drums" (Kreutzmann) – 1:16
"The Other One" (Weir, Kreutzmann) – 21:47

References

2011 live albums
Grateful Dead live albums